The women's 4 × 400 metres relay event at the 2015 European Athletics Indoor Championships was held on 8 March at 17:35 local time as a straight final.

Results

References

4 × 400 metres relay at the European Athletics Indoor Championships
2015 European Athletics Indoor Championships
2015 in women's athletics